The 2021 Winston-Salem Open was a men's tennis tournament played on outdoor hard courts. It was the 52nd edition of the Winston-Salem Open (as successor to previous tournaments in New Haven and Long Island), and part of the ATP Tour 250 Series of the 2021 ATP Tour. It took place at Wake Forest University in Winston-Salem, North Carolina, United States, from August 21 through August 28, 2021. It was the last event on the 2021 US Open Series before the 2021 US Open.

Champions

Singles 

  Ilya Ivashka def.  Mikael Ymer, 6–0, 6–2

Doubles 

  Marcelo Arévalo /  Matwé Middelkoop def.  Ivan Dodig /  Austin Krajicek, 6–7(5–7), 7–5, [10–6]

Points and prize money

Point distribution

Prize money 

*per team

Singles main-draw entrants

Seeds 

1 Rankings are as of August 16, 2021

Other entrants 
The following players received wildcards into the singles main draw:
  Pablo Carreño Busta 
  David Goffin
  Dan Evans
  Andy Murray

The following player received entry using a protected ranking into the singles main draw:
  Gilles Simon

The following players received entry from the qualifying draw:
  Denis Kudla
  Alexei Popyrin 
  Lucas Pouille
  Wu Tung-lin

The following players received entry as lucky losers:
  Pierre-Hugues Herbert
  Eduardo Nava
  Max Purcell
  Noah Rubin
  Yosuke Watanuki

Withdrawals 
Before the tournament
  Kevin Anderson → replaced by  Arthur Rinderknech
  Pablo Andújar → replaced by  Marco Cecchinato
  Nikoloz Basilashvili → replaced by  Pierre-Hugues Herbert
  Aljaž Bedene → replaced by  Tennys Sandgren
  Laslo Đere → replaced by  Mikael Ymer
  David Goffin → replaced by  Eduardo Nava
  Lloyd Harris → replaced by  Norbert Gombos
  Nick Kyrgios → replaced by  Noah Rubin
  Adrian Mannarino → replaced by  Thiago Monteiro
  John Millman → replaced by  Max Purcell
  Yoshihito Nishioka → replaced by  Facundo Bagnis
  Miomir Kecmanović → replaced by  Radu Albot
  Tommy Paul → replaced by  Andreas Seppi
  Lorenzo Sonego → replaced by  Yosuke Watanuki

Doubles main-draw entrants

Seeds 

1 Rankings are as of August 16, 2021

Other entrants 
The following pairs received wildcards into the doubles main draw:
  Siddhant Banthia /  Matthew Thomson 
  Nicholas Monroe /  Jackson Withrow

Withdrawals
Before the tournament
  Ivan Dodig /  Jamie Murray → replaced by  Ivan Dodig /  Austin Krajicek 
  Marcel Granollers /  Horacio Zeballos → replaced by  Oliver Marach /  Philipp Oswald 
  Wesley Koolhof /  Jean-Julien Rojer → replaced by  Ariel Behar /  Gonzalo Escobar 
  Kevin Krawietz /  Horia Tecău → replaced by  Tomislav Brkić /  Nikola Ćaćić 
  John Peers /  Filip Polášek → replaced by  Marcus Daniell /  Marcelo Demoliner 
  Tim Pütz /  Michael Venus → replaced by  Luke Saville /  John-Patrick Smith 
  Rajeev Ram /  Joe Salisbury → replaced by  Marcelo Arévalo /  Matwé Middelkoop

References

External links 
 

2021 ATP Tour
2021 US Open Series
2021 in American tennis
2021
August 2021 sports events in the United States